Scarff is a surname. Notable people with the surname include:

 Clark Scarff (born 1948), Australian cricketer 
 Lynn Scarff, Irish science communicator and Director-designate of the National Museum of Ireland
 J. C. Scarff, American football coach
 Peter Scarff (1908–1933) Scottish footballer 
 R. Wilson Scarff (1926–2009), American politician
 Robert Wilfred Scarff (1899-1970) British pathologists
 Ward Scarff (born 1957), Australian cricketer
 William Scarff, pen-name of Algis Budrys (1931–2008), Lithuanian-American science fiction author